The Page Up and Page Down keys (sometimes abbreviated as PgUp and PgDn) are two keys commonly found on computer keyboards.

The two keys are primarily used to scroll up or down in documents, but the scrolling distance varies between different applications. In word processors, for instance, they may jump by an emulated physical page or by a screen view that may show only part of one page or many pages at once depending on zoom factor. In cases when the document is shorter than the full screen,  and  often have no visible effect at all.

Operating systems differ as to whether the keys (pressed without modifier) simply move the view – e.g. in Mac OS X – or also the input caret – e.g. in Microsoft Windows. In right-to-left settings,  will move either upwards or rightwards (instead of left) and  will move down or leftwards (instead of right).

The arrow keys and the scroll wheel can also be used to scroll a document, although usually by smaller incremental distances.

In most operating systems, if the Page Up or Page Down key is pressed along with the  key in editable text, all the text scrolled over will be highlighted.

For a claimed 30% of people, the paging keys move the text in the opposite direction to what they find natural, and software may contain settings to reverse the operation of these keys to accommodate that.

In August 2008, Microsoft received the US patent #7,415,666 for the functions of the two keys – Page Up & Page Down.

See also
 Arrow keys
 Scroll wheel

References

Computer keys